The Crystal Spirit: A Study of George Orwell is a 1966 book of literary criticism by George Woodcock, analyzing the works and life of George Orwell.

Bibliography

External links 

 Full text at the Internet Archive

1966 non-fiction books
English-language books
Books about George Orwell
Little, Brown and Company books
Books by George Woodcock